This is a list of films which placed number-one at the box office in Australia during 2005. Amounts are in Australian dollars. Also included are the positions at the box office other films opened at. Quite a number of these are films from the previous year due to normal Australian film distribution delays. The number a film opens at does not necessarily denote its highest placement at the box office, but is intended as an indication and a guide to what theatrically released films opened and when.

References
Urban Cinefile – Box Office

See also
List of Australian films – Australian films by year
2005 in film

2005
Australia
2005 in Australian cinema